Ruggero Salar (born October 4, 1918 in San Vito al Torre) was an Italian professional football player and coach.

He played for 7 seasons (166 games, 7 goals) in the Serie A for U.S. Triestina Calcio, A.S. Roma and A.S. Lucchese Libertas 1905.

1918 births
Year of death missing
Italian footballers
Serie A players
Taranto F.C. 1927 players
U.S. Triestina Calcio 1918 players
A.S. Roma players
S.S.D. Lucchese 1905 players
Venezia F.C. players
A.C. Prato players
Italian football managers
Treviso F.B.C. 1993 managers
S.S.D. Lucchese 1905 managers
Association football midfielders